Tlaltecatzin, according to some sources, was a son of the Aztec tlatoani Moctezuma II.  In the Noche Triste ("Night of Sorrows"), the Spanish took him out of Tenochtitlan as a prisoner with other Aztec noblemen, also prisoners, including his brother Chimalpopoca. The Aztecs attacked the Spanish party, and both Tlaltecatzin and Chimalpopoca were killed.

According to another source, Tlaltecatzin was a Tepanec prince who guided the Spaniards, and was killed on the Night of Sorrows.

References

Orozco y Berra, Manuel. Historia Antigua y de la Conquista de México. Ciudad de México, 1888. Volume IV, pp 445 and 446.
González-Obregón, Luis. Las Calles de México. Ciudad de México, 1992. Page 6.

Moctezuma family
1510s in the Aztec civilization
16th-century indigenous people of the Americas
Year of death unknown
Year of birth unknown

Nobility of the Americas